Borja Fernandez is a Spanish professional vert skater. Fernandez started skating when he was 11 in 1995 and turned professional in 2001. Fernandez has attended multiple vert competition in his career.

Vert Competitions 
2008 LG Action Sports World Championships, Seattle, WA - Vert: 4th
2007 Action Sports World Tour, San Diego, CA - Vert: 7th
2007 Nokia Fise, Montpellier, France - Vert: 3rd
2006 LG Action Sports World Tour, Paris, France - Vert: 9th
2006 LG Action Sports World Tour, Birmingham, England - Vert: 7th
2005 LG Action Sports Championship, Manchester, England - Vert: 11th
2005 LG Action Sports World Tour, Moscow, Russia - Vert: 9th
2005 LG Action Sports World Tour, Munich, Germany - Vert: 7th
2005 LG Action Sports World Tour, Pomona, CA - Vert: 7th
2004 FISE, Montpellier, France - Vert: 2nd
2002 ASA World Championships - Vert: 4th
2002 European X Games - Vert: Gold Medalist
2002 FISE, Montpellier, France - Vert: 3rd
2001 ASA World Amateur Championships - Vert: Champion
2001 European X Games - Vert: 5th, Vert Doubles: 3rd

Vert Tricks Fakie Flat 900, Fakie 1260

References

External links
asaentertainment.com
skatelog.com
skatelog.com
skatelog.com
rollernews.com
rollernews.com
rollernews.com
inlineskating.about.com
seattletimes.com
borjafernandez.com
skiamosmagazine.com
rollerspain.com

1984 births
Living people
Vert skaters
X Games athletes